Rosa Alba Chacha Chacha (born 8 December 1982 in Ambato) is an Ecuadorian long-distance runner. She competed in the marathon at the 2012 Summer Olympics, placing 83rd with a time of 2:40:57, a seasonal best.

She represented Ecuador at the 2020 Summer Olympics.

Personal bests
5000 m: 16:17.75 min A –  Lima, 19 June 2009
10,000 m: 34:51.14 min A –  Lima, 21 June 2009
Half marathon: 1:13:45 hrs –  Buenos Aires, 11 September 2011
Marathon: 2:28:17 hrs –  Siena, 11 April 2021

Achievements

References

External links

Sports reference biography

1982 births
Living people
People from Ambato, Ecuador
Ecuadorian female long-distance runners
Ecuadorian female marathon runners
Pan American Games competitors for Ecuador
Athletes (track and field) at the 2011 Pan American Games
Olympic athletes of Ecuador
Athletes (track and field) at the 2012 Summer Olympics
Athletes (track and field) at the 2016 Summer Olympics
Athletes (track and field) at the 2020 Summer Olympics
Athletes (track and field) at the 2015 Pan American Games
Athletes (track and field) at the 2019 Pan American Games
21st-century Ecuadorian women